Sphingobium indicum is a hexachlorocyclohexane-degrading bacteria with type strain MTCC 6364T (=CCM 7286T). Its genome has been sequenced.

References

Further reading

External links

LPSN
Type strain of Sphingobium indicum at BacDive -  the Bacterial Diversity Metadatabase

Sphingomonadales